Bellevue is a suburb of Tauranga, in the Bay of Plenty Region of New Zealand's North Island.

Bellevue has an athletics club which takes part in national championships.

A woman fired a gun in the suburb in March 2019, sparking a lockdown of local schools.

Two girls were held hostage by their father in their Bellevue home in November 2019, before Police shot the father.

Demographics

Bellevue had a population of 3,807 at the 2018 New Zealand census, an increase of 270 people (7.6%) since the 2013 census, and an increase of 408 people (12.0%) since the 2006 census. There were 1,284 households, comprising 1,854 males and 1,953 females, giving a sex ratio of 0.95 males per female. The median age was 33.5 years (compared with 37.4 years nationally), with 918 people (24.1%) aged under 15 years, 783 (20.6%) aged 15 to 29, 1,740 (45.7%) aged 30 to 64, and 369 (9.7%) aged 65 or older.

Ethnicities were 83.0% European/Pākehā, 20.3% Māori, 3.2% Pacific peoples, 7.7% Asian, and 1.8% other ethnicities. People may identify with more than one ethnicity.

The percentage of people born overseas was 20.5, compared with 27.1% nationally.

Although some people chose not to answer the census's question about religious affiliation, 55.9% had no religion, 32.2% were Christian, 1.2% had Māori religious beliefs, 0.7% were Hindu, 0.2% were Muslim, 0.4% were Buddhist and 3.8% had other religions.

Of those at least 15 years old, 546 (18.9%) people had a bachelor's or higher degree, and 462 (16.0%) people had no formal qualifications. The median income was $33,500, compared with $31,800 nationally. 393 people (13.6%) earned over $70,000 compared to 17.2% nationally. The employment status of those at least 15 was that 1,554 (53.8%) people were employed full-time, 498 (17.2%) were part-time, and 111 (3.8%) were unemployed.

Education

Otumoetai College is a co-educational state secondary school established in 1965, with a roll of over 2,200.

References

Suburbs of Tauranga
Populated places around the Tauranga Harbour